The 2017 Tulane Green Wave football team represented Tulane University in the 2017 NCAA Division I FBS football season. The Green Wave played their home games at Yulman Stadium in New Orleans, Louisiana, and competed in the West Division of the American Athletic Conference. They were led by second-year head coach Willie Fritz. They finished the season 5–7, 3–5 in AAC play to finish in fifth place in the West Division.

Schedule
Tulane announced its 2017 football schedule on February 9, 2017. The 2017 schedule consists of 6 home and away games in the regular season. The Green Wave hosted AAC foes Cincinnati, Houston, South Florida, and Tulsa, and traveled to East Carolina, Memphis, Navy, and SMU.

The Green Wave hosted two of the four non-conference opponents: Army, which is an independent football school, and Grambling State from the Southwestern Athletic Conference. The team traveled to Florida International (FIU) from Conference USA and Oklahoma from the Big 12 Conference.

Schedule Source:

Game summaries

Grambling State

at Navy

at Oklahoma

Army

Tulsa

at FIU

South Florida

at Memphis

Cincinnati

at East Carolina

Houston

at SMU

Players in the 2018 NFL Draft

References

Tulane
Tulane Green Wave football seasons
Tulane Green Wave football